The Association of Environmental and Resource Economists (AERE) was founded in 1979 in the United States as a means of exchanging ideas, stimulating research, and promoting graduate training in environmental and natural resource economics. The majority of its members are affiliated with universities, government agencies, non-profit research organizations, and consulting firms. Many of AERE's members hold graduate degrees in economics, agricultural economics, or related fields, but there are numerous student members as well. The organization also serves many non-specialist members with environmental policy interests. The United States is the country with the largest single share of AERE members, but the organization welcomes members from all countries. Annual individual memberships currently number approximately 800. AERE is generally acknowledged as the primary professional organization for Environmental and Natural Resources economists in the USA. The European Association of Environmental and Resource Economists is its European equivalent.

Journals
AERE has two journals: the Journal of the Association for Environmental and Resource Economists, and the Review of Environmental Economics and Policy.

Newsletter
AERE started to issue digital newsletter to current AERE members twice a year from 1981.  The newsletter includes policy essays, meeting announcements, calls for papers, new publications, research reports, position announcements and other information of interest to AERE members and environmental economists in general.

Activities
AERE sponsors annual summer meetings jointly with the AAEA (Agricultural & Applied Economics Association) and annual winter meetings with the ASSA (Allied Social Sciences Association). The AERE Workshop takes place each June, and is traditionally organized around a single theme with the generous sponsorship of a consortium of government agencies. Its topics range from environmental policy to non-point source pollution to heath risks. Current sponsors of the workshop are the National Oceanic and Atmospheric Administration, Economic Research Service (US Department of Agriculture), and the Fish and Wildlife Service (US Department of the Interior).
In some cases, there are special AERE sessions at the meetings of regional economics associations (such as the Southern Economic Association (SEA) and, beginning in 2009, the Western Economic Association International (WEAI).  AERE also co-sponsors the World Congress of Environmental and Resource Economists which is held every four years, and will be held next in 2010.
Its website aere.org was set up as the AERE gopher (AERE-G) in 1994 at the University of Kentucky. In the same year, its volunteer AERE e-mail listserv (AERE-L) also began. Now RESECON is the official e-mail listserv of AERE.

Awards
AERE confers an award, annually, for a Publication of Enduring Quality in the field of environmental and natural resource economics. The organization also designates up to three new AERE Fellows each year. The awards are conferred at the Annual AERE Luncheon each January, when the organization sponsors a series of sessions in conjunction with the Allied Social Sciences Association (ASSA) meetings.

Sister organization
AERE maintains an affiliation with its European sister organization, the European Association of Environmental and Resource Economists, founded in 1990. Many environmental economists hold memberships in both AERE and EAERE.

References

External links
 Association of Environmental and Resource Economists
 Journal of Environmental Economics and Management
 Review of Environmental Economics and Policy
 RESECON email listserv

Professional associations based in the United States
Environmental organizations based in the United States